Buddinge is a suburb 10 km northwest of central Copenhagen, Denmark. The suburb used to be a small village, but by the 1960s merged with nearby suburban areas, subsequently becoming a suburb. The suburb is part of Gladsaxe municipal and is connected by the S-Train with two stations: Buddinge and Kildebakke.

Notable people 
 Andreas Petersen (1901 in Buddinge – 1976) a Danish boxer who competed in the 1924 Summer Olympics
 Kaj Ejstrup (1902–1956) a Danish artist, illustrator and sculptor and an Odsherred painter, brought up in Buddinge

References

Municipal seats in the Capital Region of Denmark
Municipal seats of Denmark
Copenhagen metropolitan area
Neighbourhoods in Denmark
Gladsaxe Municipality